The 1975 Individual Ice Speedway World Championship was the tenth edition of the World Championship.

The winner was Sergey Tarabanko of the Soviet Union.

Final 

 February 22–23
  Moscow

References

Ice speedway competitions
Ice